The Fukushima Kinen (Japanese 福島記念) is a Grade 3 horse race for Thoroughbreds aged three and over, run in November over a distance of 2000 metres on turf at Fukushima Racecourse.

It was first run in 1965 and has held Grade 3 status since 1984. The race was run at Niigata Racecourse in 1995, 1996 and 2011.

Winners since 2000

Earlier winners

 1984 - Suzu Parade
 1985 - Blacksky
 1986 - Running Free
 1987 - Mr Brandy
 1988 - Lake Black
 1989 - Mr Brandy
 1990 - Hashino Kenshiro
 1991 - Yagura Stella
 1992 - Arashi
 1993 - Pegasus
 1994 - Silk Greyish
 1995 - Meiner Bridge
 1996 - Maillot Jaune
 1997 - T M Oarashi
 1998 - Over The Wall
 1999 - Port Brians

See also
 Horse racing in Japan
 List of Japanese flat horse races

References

Turf races in Japan